Fichtelbergschanzen are ski jumping hills in Oberwiesenthal, Germany.

History
Original hill was opened in 1938 and demolished in 1972. They built a totally new steel inrun in 1974 and again totally reconstructed in 1991. It hosted FIS Ski jumping World Cup events in 1980s and more world cup events in Nordic combined. Tobias Bogner holds the hill record.

Oberwiesenthal hosted the 2020 Nordic Junior World Ski Championships.

World Cup

Men

References

Ski jumping venues in Germany
Oberwiesenthal
Sports venues completed in 1938
1938 establishments in Germany